State Route 284 (SR 284, OH 284) is a north–south state highway in east central Ohio, a U.S. state. The northern terminus of State Route 284 is at a T-intersection with State Route 146 in the unincorporated community of Chandlersville. A portion of SR 284 is part of the Morgan County Scenic Byway.

Route description
State Route 284 runs through portions of Morgan and Muskingum Counties.  No portion of this state highway is included within the National Highway System.

History
The year 1930 marked the debut of State Route 284 in the Ohio state highway system.  Routed at inception along the path that it currently occupies, State Route 284 has not experienced any significant changes.

Major intersections

References

External links

State Route 284 Endpoint Photos

284
Transportation in Morgan County, Ohio
Transportation in Muskingum County, Ohio
Scenic byways in Ohio